The Seljuk Brigade is or was a Syrian Turkmen rebel group participating in the Syrian Civil War, named after the Seljuk Turks.

History
The Seljuk Brigade was founded in early 2013 in the northern Aleppo Governorate by Colonel Talal Ali Silo and was temporary a part of the Suleyman Shah Brigade. 

It was initially based in the mainly-Turkmen village of al-Rai, before its capture by the Islamic State of Iraq and the Levant (ISIL) in January 2014. As with the other Syrian Turkmen Brigades, the group was supplied and armed by Turkey, although tensions occurred between them after the capture of al-Rai due to Turkey favouring the Fatih Sultan Mehmed Brigade in Jarabulus, sending only a limited amount of arms to the Seljuk Brigade.

It then joined the Army of Revolutionaries in August 2015, which became part of the Syrian Democratic Forces in October 2015. The group's commander, Talal Silo, was present at the SDF formation announcement; furthermore, he announced the SDF's 2015 Al-Hawl offensive. In November 2017, Silo surrendered to Turkey. 

Unlike other Turkmen rebel groups, they are allied with the Kurdish People's Protection Units. The Seljuk Brigade in Manbij condemned the Turkish military intervention in Syria in late August 2016.

On 10 September 2016 one of the brigade's commanders, Hani al-Mullah, died of a gunshot to the head in the town of Tell Abyad. Raqqa Is Being Slaughtered Silently claimed that his death was the result of suicide, although other sources dispute this and allege that the killing was an assassination, either by the Turkish National Intelligence Organization and Turkish rebels or by ISIL militants. As a result, a curfew was imposed in Tell Abyad.

References

Anti-government factions of the Syrian civil war
Anti-ISIL factions in Syria
Syrian Democratic Forces
Syrian Turkmen organizations
Turkish supported militant groups of the Syrian civil war